Vrinda Tv is a Hindi-language 24/7 Hindu television channel, owned by Dr Sanjeev Vrinda.

References

Hindi-language television channels in India
Television channels and stations established in 2015
Hindi-language television stations
Television stations in India
2015 establishments in Delhi